The Caribbean Select rugby union team are an inter-island sporting side with players coming from Trinidad & Tobago (T&T), Guyana, Jamaica, Barbados, and St Vincent and the Grenadines, representing them at rugby union. The side first played in 2010.

History
The team was created in 2008 to give the US and Canadian U20 sides, competing in that year's NACRA tournament, extra games after the cost of travelling to Bahamas prevented most islands from sending their own teams. Players in 2008 came from  Bermuda, Mexico, Jamaica, British Virgin Islands, Saint Vincent & the Grenadines, Barbados, and Guyana.

Results summary
(Full internationals only)

Results

Full internationals

Other matches

See also
Article by BVI's Cassandra Molver, who played in the team in 2010